SS Palo Alto was a concrete ship built as a tanker at the end of World War I. Completed too late to see war service, she was mothballed until 1929, when she was intentionally grounded off Seacliff State Beach in the Monterey Bay, becoming part of a pleasure pier entertainment complex. Palo Alto was damaged by the sea, leading her to be stripped and used only as a fishing pier.  Subsequent decades have seen her be further broken by the sea, but large sections of her wreck remain somewhat intact.

History 

SS Palo Alto was built by the San Francisco Shipbuilding Company at the U.S. Naval Shipyard in Oakland, California. She was launched on 29 May 1919, too late to see service in the war.

Palo Alto was mothballed in Oakland until 1929, when she was bought by the Seacliff Amusement Corporation and towed to Seacliff State Beach in Aptos, California. A pier was built leading to the ship in 1930, and she was sunk in a few feet in the water so that her keel rested on the bottom. There she was refitted as an amusement ship, with amenities including a dance floor, a swimming pool and a café.The company went bankrupt two years later during the Great Depression, and the ship cracked at the midsection during a winter storm. The State of California purchased the ship, and she was stripped of her fittings and left as a fishing pier. She was a popular site for recreational fishing, but eventually she deteriorated to the point where she was unsafe for this purpose, and she was closed to the public in 1950. Following an attempt at restoration in the 1980s, she reopened for fishing for a few years, then closed again. The fishing pier opened to foot traffic once again in the summer of 2016, but later closed for repairs.

Nicknamed the "Cement Ship", Palo Alto serves as an artificial reef for marine life. Pelicans and other seabirds perch on the wreck, sea perch and other fish feed on algae that grow in the shelter of the wreck, and sea lions and other marine mammals visit the wreck to feed on the fish.

In the spring of 2005, oil found on wildlife nearly two years earlier, killing dozens of seabirds, was traced back to the ship, whose fuel tanks had cracked and were leaking fuel oil. In September 2006, a clean-up project was started that cost an estimated $1.7 million, approximately the same as the estimated $1.5 million cost of the original construction of the ship in 1919. During the clean-up, workers pumped 500 U.S. gallons (416 Imperial gallons; 1,893 liters) of oil from the ship and discovered the carcasses of 200 more birds and two harbor seals inside the wreck.

The ship continued to deteriorate after the clean-up. While she had over the decades been broken into four roughly segmented pieces, winter storms in February 2016 pushed the wreck onto her starboard side and broke her rear half open. On 21 January 2017, another winter storm tore the stern off the ship. On 5 January 2023, yet another winter storm destroyed portions of the pier leading to the ship.

See also
SS Selma (1919)

References

External links 

Palo Alto information at ConcreteShips.org
Palo Alto information at California State Parks website

Design 1100 tankers
Shipwrecks of the California coast
SS Palo Alto
SS Palo Alto
1919 ships
Concrete ships
Oil tankers
History of Santa Cruz County, California
History of the Monterey Bay Area
Ships built in Oakland, California
Ships sunk as breakwaters